Qater Yuran-e Sofla (also Romanized as Qāţer Yūrān-e Soflá; also known as Haft Barādar) is a village in Ojarud-e Shomali Rural District, in the Central District of Germi County, Ardabil Province, Iran. At the 2006 census, its population was 90, in 21 families.

References 

Towns and villages in Germi County